Epidelus is a genus of beetles in the family Buprestidae, containing the following species:

 Epidelus borneensis (Thery, 1925)
 Epidelus ceramensis Thery, 1934
 Epidelus wallacei (Thomson, 1857)

References

Buprestidae genera